The 2016 Russian Football Super Cup was the 14th Russian Super Cup match, a football match which was contested between the 2015–16 Russian Premier League champion, CSKA Moscow, and the 2015–16 Russian Cup champion, Zenit Saint Petersburg.

The match was held on 23 July 2016 at the Lokomotiv Stadium, in Moscow.

Match details

See also
2016–17 Russian Premier League
2016–17 Russian Cup

References

Super Cup
Russian Super Cup
Russian Super Cup 2016
Russian Super Cup 2016
Russian Super Cup
2016 in Moscow
Sports competitions in Moscow